The Recess Ends (2009) is a documentary film by brothers Austin and Brian Chu about the 2008-2009 recession. They crossed the United States to document the effects of the recession on people and communities, and filmed in all 50 states.

The film premiered at the Victoria Theater in San Francisco on September 30, 2009.

External links
Film's Official Website

"Brothers Chronicle Recession on Film", San Francisco Chronicle (Sept. 25, 2009)
 with reviews of the film

2009 films
Documentary films about the United States
American documentary films
2009 documentary films
Documentary films about the Great Recession
2000s American films